Kaushik Menon (also known as Kaushik) is a vocalist and an Indian playback singer working in the south Indian film industry. He started his professional playback singing career in the year in 2003, and since has been working as playback singer for multiple languages - including Malayalam, Tamil, and Telugu. He is known for his song, "Natkal Nagarndhu" – the song of friendship from the movie Ninaithale Inikkum that gave him a major breakthrough as a playback singer. He owns a recording studio at Chennai named 'Tapas Studio'. At present he is working as an RJ in a reputed FM in UAE, also he is busy with his music events.

Playback singing career

Early career
Kaushik Menon started his singing in school youth festivals & stage shows and later at his age of 18 he encouraged by the veteran singer S. Janaki to go to Chennai and she supported him through giving opportunities to sing in many stage shows. Later on he got an opportunity to sing in front of music director Ilayaraja in the year 2003 and started his playback singing career. He was recognised by people through his Ninaithale Inikkum movie song composed by Vijay Antony and he got the best upcoming playback singer award from Mirchi music awards.

2009 and onward
In 2009, Kaushik won "Best Upcoming Male Singer" in Mirchi Music Award South for his song "Natkal Nagarndhu", from the movie Ninaithale Inikkum. In 2013, Kaushik attempted singing the male cover version of "Nenjukulle" from A.R. Rahman’s movie Kadal, (originally sung by Shakthisree Gopalan).

In 2013, he made entry into the Mollywood with a duet melody number "Nin Mounavum from the movie Entry. His melody number, "Oru Mozhi Mindathe" from the Malayalam film Law Point'' gave him a major breakthrough in Mollywood, since then, he has worked with many music directors including A.R. Rahman, Harris Jayaraj, Vijay Antony, Joshua Sridhar, and Mejo Joseph.

Filmography as a playback singer

Tamil songs

Malayalam songs

Telugu songs

Kannada Songs

Television Title Songs

Awards 
Mirchi Music Awards South

See also

Others 

 വിജയ് യേശുദാസിനോട് കൗശിക് മേനോന്‌ പറയാനുള്ളത് | Kaushik Menon - Karma News, October 23, 2020.
 10 അവസരം ഒരാൾക്ക് കൊടുക്കുമ്പോൾ, കഷ്ടപ്പെടുന്ന കഴിവുള്ള ഒരു കലാകാരന് ഒരു അവസരം കൊടുത്തൂടെ - Karma News, June 20, 2020
 തെരുവു മൃഗങ്ങളെ വളർത്താൻ ലൈസൻസ് എടുക്കണമെന്ന നിയമം ഉപകാരപ്രദമാണോ എന്ന് ചിന്തിക്കേണ്ടതുണ്ട്, കൗശിക് മേനോൻ - Karma News, July 19, 2021
 കെ എസ് ചിത്രയെ അപമാനിച്ചു, കണ്ണീരോടെ കൗശിക് മേനോൻ -  Karma News, Jan 22 2022

External links 
 Few of Kaushik Menon's songs on Music India Online

Living people
Indian male playback singers
Singers from Kerala
Tamil playback singers
Telugu playback singers
Musicians from Palakkad
Tamil singers
Malayalam playback singers
Film musicians from Kerala
21st-century Indian male singers
21st-century Indian singers
Year of birth missing (living people)